The Tom and Jerry Comedy Show (also known as The New Adventures of Tom and Jerry) is an American animated television series produced by Filmation for MGM Television featuring the popular cartoon duo Tom and Jerry. The show first aired on September 6, 1980 on CBS and continued until December 13, 1980. Its episodes were eventually added to syndicated Tom and Jerry packages in 1983. Episodes of the show also occasionally appeared on Cartoon Network and Boomerang.

Description 
The series is the fifth incarnation of the popular Tom and Jerry cartoon franchise, and the second made-for-television production. The series was notable in being the first attempt since the closing of the MGM studio in the 1950s to restore the original format of the cat and mouse team. After the original 114 theatrical shorts run of the William Hanna-Joseph Barbera directed series, the characters were leased to other animation studios which changed the designs, and eliminated all of the supporting characters. The previous made-for-TV series, The Tom and Jerry Show was produced in 1975 by Hanna and Barbera under their own studio under contract to MGM, but it had made the cat and mouse friends in most of the episodes due to the reaction against violence in cartoons. This series was able to restore the familiar slapstick chase format, and reintroduced not only Spike and Tyke and Nibbles (here named "Tuffy"), but not Mammy Two Shoes who was retired from the cartoons in 1953 for portraying a Mammy archetype. Half-hour episodes would consist of two Tom and Jerry shorts in the first and third segments, plus one Droopy short in the middle segment, also often featuring some other classic MGM cartoon characters such as Barney Bear. Spike from Tom and Jerry was used in many of these Droopy episodes as well, filling in for the other "Spike" bulldog created by Tex Avery for the old Droopy films, who was not used as a separate character here. The villainous wolf from the classic series was also included, and named "Slick Wolf", though with the series produced under the "Seal of Good Practice" code, the title character from "Red Hot Riding Hood", where the Wolf debuted, would not reappear. 

The show's opening begins with Tom chasing Jerry through a blank yellow screen. They continue chasing, as all of the other stars build a giant "Tom & Jerry" sign (similar to the second opening of Tom & Jerry Kids). The familiar rotating executive producer credit of Lou Scheimer and Norm Prescott briefly runs as Tom chases Jerry past the screen, knocking things over and running over others along the way. After the opening sequence, the wraparound segments, hosted by Droopy, would begin. He would start by painting the whole background with a single large brush stroke and he and the other speaking characters would engage in brief comedic sketches (like Droopy's opening poem in one of them "Roses are red, violets are blue, painting's my job, that's what I do; cute and somewhat wet").

In addition to the use of limited animation, the show was characterized by a very limited music score; all of the short, both Tom & Jerry and Droopy segments, used the same stock music, mostly created new for the series but consisting of only a handful of largely synthesized tunes, either with minor variations or played at different speeds or pitches. This did match the chase scenes, but gave the episodes a very monotonous soundtrack, making these episodes "stand out" to many Tom and Jerry viewers when they aired. Where the original series and the third series by Chuck Jones would have favorable endings for Tom occasionally, this series followed the second series by Gene Deitch in almost never having definite "wins" for Tom. Also similar to the Deitch films is the character design. The Droopy episodes would usually feature Slick and sometimes Spike being antagonists to Droopy. Barney had miscellaneous roles, such as being the boss of movie studio guard Droopy in "Star Crossed Wolf", and a frightful companion to Droopy in a haunted house in "Scared Bear".

The show was originally going to be called The Cat and Jam Comedy Show.

Voice cast 
Frank Welker and Filmation head Lou Scheimer provided the voices for the first six episodes. Welker voiced Spike, Tyke (in "The Puppy Sitter"; the character was silent in the wraparound segments), Droopy, Slick, Barney, Tom's owner and other characters. Lou Scheimer voiced Tom, Jerry, Tuffy (erroneously giving him an adult voice, although his voice sounded appropriately higher and childlike in the wraparound segments before "Droopy's Restless Night", "Pest in the West", "Getting the Foot", "Old Mother Hubbard" and "The Great Mousini"), Slick in the wraparound segments before "Droopy's Restless Night", "Invasion of the Mouse Snatchers", "The Incredible Droop", "Incredible Shrinking Cat", "When the Rooster Crows" and "School for Cats", Barney in the wraparound segments before "Pest in the West", "The Incredible Droop", "The Plaid Baron Strikes Again", "Incredible Shrinking Cat", "When the Rooster Crows", "School for Cats" and "Pied Piper Puss" and "The Incredible Droop", Spike in the wraparound segments before "Invasion of the Mouse Snatchers", "Scared Bear" and "School for Cats" and "School for Cats", and other characters. From the seventh episode onward, Welker voiced Droopy, while the other male characters in the Tom and Jerry and Droopy segments (including Spike, Slick, Barney and Tom's owner) were voiced by Scheimer. Welker's voice was also heard in the eighth, 12th, 13th and 14th episodes as Nibbles, Slick, Barney and other characters. Additional voices were done by Lennie Weinrib, Norm Prescott, Jay Scheimer, Erika Scheimer and other voice actors, with Jay, Erika and other actresses voicing the female characters, although Welker voiced two of them and Lou Scheimer voiced twelve of them.

 Frank Welker – Spike and Tyke (episodes 1–6), Tuffy (episode 8), Droopy, Slick (episodes 1–6, episode 12, episode 14), Barney Bear (episodes 1–6, episode 8), additional voices (episodes 1–5, episode 8, episodes 13–14)
 Lou Scheimer – Tom, Jerry, Spike (wraparound segments, episodes 6–15), Tuffy, Slick (wraparound segments, episodes 7–15), Barney Bear (wraparound segments, episode 4, episodes 7–15), additional voices
 Norm Prescott – Additional voices (episode 6, episode 11)
 Jay Scheimer – Additional voices (episode 2, episode 6, episode 12)
 Erika Scheimer – Additional voices (episode 1, episode 6)
 Lennie Weinrib – Additional voices (episode 3, episode 14)

Episodes

Home media
Warner Bros. currently owns the rights to The Tom and Jerry Comedy Show via Turner Entertainment. However, due to the show's negative reception and legal issues involving MGM outsourcing the animation to Filmation, Warner Bros. has no plans for a DVD box set of the show. However, one episode, "Jerry's Country Cousin", did surface on the 70th anniversary DVD collection in 2010. All 30 Tom and Jerry segments of this incarnation (along with 8 Droopy segments) are available on the Boomerang app.

See also 
 The Tom and Jerry Show (1975)
 Tom & Jerry Kids
 Tom and Jerry Tales
 The Tom and Jerry Show (2014)
 Tom and Jerry Special Shorts
 Tom and Jerry in New York

References

External links 
 
 

Comedy Show
American children's animated comedy television series
English-language television shows
1980 American television series debuts
1980 American television series endings
1980s American variety television series
1980s American animated comedy television series
CBS original programming
Television series by Filmation
Television series by MGM Television
Television series set in 1980
Animated television series about cats
Animated television series about mice and rats
Big Bad Wolf
American animated variety television series